The Lower 63rd Yard is located in the Washington Park neighborhood on the South Side of Chicago, Illinois. It is located along the Green Line of the Chicago Transit Authority and across 63rd Street from 61st Yard. It is currently used to store non-revenue and maintenance equipment.

References 

Chicago Transit Authority